Yohannan VII bar Targhal was Patriarch of the Church of the East from 1049 to 1057.  He lived through the final years of the Buyid dynasty, and was present in Baghdad when Toghrul Beg, the first sultan of the Seljuq dynasty, entered the city in December 1055.  His patriarchate was dominated by communal rioting in Baghdad between Shiite Moslems loyal to the Buyids and Sunni Moslems who supported the Seljuqs.  During these riots the Greek Palace, the residence of the Nestorian patriarchs, was twice pillaged.

Sources 

Yohannan's patriarchate 
The following account of Yohannan's patriarchate is given by Bar Hebraeus:

After Eliya I, the elderly Yohannan bar Targhal, bishop of Qasr, was consecrated catholicus of the Nestorians at Baghdad, on the third Sunday of the Annunciation, in the eighth month of the Arabs in the year 441 [AD 1049/50].  Because the Greek Palace had been destroyed in the time of his predecessor and the patriarchal cell had also been pillaged, he set himself to build a new cell at his own expense and with the help of the faithful.  But six years later troops from Khorasan entered Baghdad, and the eastern suburbs, including the Greek Palace and the patriarchal cell, were plundered.  He therefore left Baghdad and went to live in the monastery of the Reeds, but later returned to Baghdad.  He died in the year 449 of the Arabs [AD 1057/8].

See also
 List of patriarchs of the Church of the East

Notes

References
 Abbeloos, J. B., and Lamy, T. J., Bar Hebraeus, Chronicon Ecclesiasticum (3 vols, Paris, 1877)
 Assemani, J. A., De Catholicis seu Patriarchis Chaldaeorum et Nestorianorum (Rome, 1775)
 Brooks, E. W., Eliae Metropolitae Nisibeni Opus Chronologicum (Rome, 1910)
 Gismondi, H., Maris, Amri, et Salibae: De Patriarchis Nestorianorum Commentaria I: Amri et Salibae Textus (Rome, 1896)
 Gismondi, H., Maris, Amri, et Salibae: De Patriarchis Nestorianorum Commentaria II: Maris textus arabicus et versio Latina (Rome, 1899)

Patriarchs of the Church of the East
11th-century bishops of the Church of the East
Nestorians in the Abbasid Caliphate
1057 deaths